Rohan Castle (French: Château des Rohan, German: Rohan-Schloss), also known as Château Neuf (New Castle), is an eighteenth-century neoclassical palace in the city of Saverne in Alsace, France. It was one of the residences of Archbishops of Strasbourg, rulers of the Prince-Bishopric of Strasbourg, which was an ecclesiastical principality of the Holy Roman Empire from the 13th century until 1803. A series of members of the House of Rohan held the see in the 18th century. The 140 metre wide façade of red Vosges sandstone is considered to be one of the most impressive examples of its kind.

The building was erected between 1780 and 1790 by the architect Nicolas Salins de Montfort on the site of the previous building, which had been built in 1670 and burned down in 1779. This previous building had in turn replaced the small Château Vieux (Old Castle) of 1417, which is still preserved today. That building saw two of the three marriages of Charles, Prince de Soubise; firstly in 1741 to Anne Therese of Savoy and secondly to Anne Victoire of Hesse-Rotenburg in 1745.

The architect of the new castle had been commissioned by the Strasbourg Prince-Bishop Louis René Édouard de Rohan-Guéméné, who also resided in the magnificent Rohan Palace in the city where he held office, as well as in the less stately Rohan Castle of Mutzig. In order to furnish the castle, Louis René assembled a vast collection of costly Qing porcelain and lacquerware. The surviving pieces of this collection are prominently displayed in the apartments of the Strasbourg palace.

By the time of the outbreak of the French Revolution, only the outside was completed. When cleric rule was abolished, the building lost both its owner and its function.

The gradual decline of the building was stopped under Napoleon III, who had it renovated and extended in the direction of the city. Already in 1853, the park was irrevocably cut and destroyed by the Marne-Rhine Canal. Since 1858, the castle houses a city museum (history, decorative arts, a large archaeological department), which was joined by the art and ethnographic collection of the politician Louise Weiss in the 20th century. Previously, the castle had served at times as a home for officers' widows and, after the Franco-Prussian War, as a barracks. Today, one of its wings is used as a youth hostel, and another houses the Espace Rohan, Saverne's 500-seat theatre and concert hall.

The castle is listed as a Monument historique since 1933 by the French Ministry of Culture.

See also 
 List of Baroque residences
 Municipal Museum (Saverne)

Notes

External links 

 History of the castle
 Views on en.structurae.de

Châteaux in Bas-Rhin
Episcopal palaces
Neoclassical architecture in France
Monuments historiques of Bas-Rhin